The Montreal Aquarium, also known as the Alcan Aquarium, was a public aquarium on St. Helen's Island, Montreal, Quebec, Canada. It was built in 1966 for Expo 67 and shut down in 1991. It reopened as the Nintendo Mégadôme from 1995 to 2007. The Expo pavilion was originally sponsored by Alcan Aluminum Ltd., who built the site as a joint venture with the City of Montreal and the Zoological Society of Montreal. The main aquarium featured penguin pools, exhibits space and a gift shop. The separate dolphin pool had a 900-seat auditorium, show pool and holding tanks.

History

Montreal Aquadome (1967–1991)
After a workers' strike in February 1980, two dolphins starved to death. The surviving dolphins were sold to Flipper's Sea School, a roadside dolphin attraction in Florida. The already failing aquarium received even more negative publicity.

The city planned in 1988 to move the aquarium to a more popular location at the Old Port, but the plan did not come through when the city was mired in recession in the early 1990s.

On September 15, 1991, the aquarium officially closed. Most of its exhibits were transferred to the Biodome. The site of the former aquarium now belongs to the amusement park La Ronde. The main aquarium building is now the Pass Building and the dolphin pool is vacant and closed off from the public.

Nintendo Mégadôme (1995–2007)

The Nintendo Mégadôme opened in 1995.

References

External links
 Nintendo Mégadôme (in English)
 Photo and floor plan (linked)

1966 establishments in Quebec
1991 disestablishments in Quebec
Aquaria in Canada
Defunct museums in Canada
Demolished buildings and structures in Montreal
Expo 67
History of Montreal
La Ronde (amusement park)
Museums established in 1966
Aquarium
World's fair architecture in Montreal
Defunct aquaria